Arnsberg is a town in the Hochsauerland county, in the German state of North Rhine-Westphalia. It is the location of the Regierungsbezirk Arnsberg administration and one of the three local administration offices of the Hochsauerlandkreis district.

Geography

Location
Arnsberg is located in the north-east of the Sauerland in the Ruhr river valley. The river Ruhr meanders around the south of the old town of Arnsberg. The town is nearly completely encircled by forest, and the nature park Arnsberger Wald lies to the north".

Arnsberg is connected by Federal Motorway 46 (Autobahn 46) Brilon in the east and (using the Federal Motorway 445) Werl in the west. It is also connected by several railroad stations, which provide a connection to the major city Dortmund and the Ruhrgebiet. There is also a regional airport, located in the city district of Vosswinkel, which is exclusively used for small private aircraft.

Neighbouring municipalities
 Ense
 Möhnesee
 Warstein
 Meschede
 Sundern
 Balve
 Menden

Subdivisions
After the local government reforms of 1975 Arnsberg consists of 15 boroughs (Ortsteile):
 Neheim (23,448 inhabitants)
 Arnsberg (19,355 inhabitants)
 Hüsten (11,304 inhabitants)
 Oeventrop (6,713 inhabitants)
 Herdringen (4,118 inhabitants)
 Bruchhausen (3,337 inhabitants)
 Müschede (2,870 inhabitants)
 Voßwinkel (2,523 inhabitants)
 Niedereimer (2,082 inhabitants)
 Holzen (2,022 inhabitants)
 Rumbeck (1,305 inhabitants)
 Wennigloh (1,004 inhabitants)
 Bachum (959 inhabitants)
 Breitenbruch (219 inhabitants)
 Uentrop (346 inhabitants)

History

Beginnings 
Arnsberg was first mentioned in 789 in the Carolingian records (Urbar) as belonging to the abbey of Werden.

Arnsberg was the seat of the Counts of Arnsberg from around 1070 and received city rights in 1238. In 1368 the last of the Counts of Arnsberg, Count Gottfried IV, handed over the city and county to Kurköln as he had no heir.

They built a castle there whose remains can still be visited and are occasionally used for public celebrations.

In the 12th century, old Arnsberg became the seat of Westphalian jurisdiction (whose coat of arms is still used today by the Hochsauerlandkreis). Later, the city lost its independence and was subject to the Archbishops of Cologne.

18th/19th Century 
The castle of Arnsberg was destroyed in the Seven Years' War in 1769.

In 1794 the French attacked Cologne, so parts of the treasure of the Cologne Cathedral were brought to safety in Arnsberg, along with the relics of the Biblical Magi. In 1804, the treasure was returned to Cologne, as commemorated by a plaque in the Propsteikirche.

In 1816, Arnsberg came under Prussian rule and was made a local administrative centre.

World War Two 
Neheim and Hüsten were merged in 1941.

During the Second World War, Arnsberg first suffered widespread destruction and catastrophic loss of lives when RAF Lancasters  breached the dam of the Möhne Reservoir in the night of the 16 to 17 May 1943 (Operation Chastise). The nearby Abbey Himmelpforten was completely washed away.

Later, dozens of Arnsberg's citizens were killed in several British air raids aimed at destroying the railway viaduct. The targets were finally destroyed on 19 March 1945 using a 'Grand Slam' bomb.

Contemporary history 
The current city of Arnsberg was created in 1975 by merging 12 surrounding municipalities (Bachum, Breitenbruch, Herdringen, Holzen, Müschede, Niedereimer, Oeventrop, Rumbeck, Uentrop, Voßwinkel and Wennigloh) into one city.

Old Arnsberg itself and Neheim-Hüsten are the two main urban areas, while the other parts are mainly rural areas.

Demographics

Religion
Arnsberg's population is mostly Roman Catholic. Arnsberg belongs to the Archdiocese of Paderborn. Catholic churches include the "Propsteikirche" or the "Heilig-Kreuz Kirche" and the "Auferstehungskirche", which is a Protestant church. There is also a  New Apostolic congregation.

In recent years Arnsberg's Muslim minority grew considerably. The town has a mosque.

The cemeteries are mostly Catholic but there is also a Jewish cemetery.

Arts and culture
The Kunstverein Arnsberg operates in Arnsberg. Founded in 1987 and devoted to contemporary art, Kunstverein Arnsberg has presented solo exhibitions by artists including Georg Baselitz, Thomas Ruff, Karin Sander, Dan Perjovschi, Boris Mikhailov, Gregor Schneider, Erwin Wurm, the Turner Prize winner Susan Philipsz and the Marcel Duchamp Prize winner Laurent Grasso.

Government

City arms
The arms of the city depict a white eagle on a blue field. Earlier it was a white eagle on a red field, introduced in 1278 and as used by the counts of Arnsberg . In the 17th century the red was changed to blue, reflecting the Bavarian blue of the House of Wittelsbach.

Mayors
Mayors of the new town Arnsberg

Twin towns – sister cities

Arnsberg is twinned with:
 Alba Iulia, Romania
 Deventer, Netherlands
 Bexley, England, United Kingdom
 Olesno, Poland
 Caltagirone, Italy

Notable people

Franz von Fürstenberg (1729–1810), statesman and reformer school in  Archbishopric Münster, founder of the Münster University
Wilhelm Hasenclever, (1837–1889), politician
Karl Brüggemann (1896–1977), honorary district in Kreis Arnsberg from 1961 to 1969
Franz Stock (1904–1948), since 1934 pastor of the German Catholic community in Paris, during the German occupation chaplain for French prisoners (companion sentenced to death), 1945 head of a prisoner of war seminar in Chartres
Hans Bernd Gisevius, (1904–1974), diplomat
Fritz Cremer, (1906–1993), artist
Betsy von Furstenberg, (1931–2015), actress
Franz Müntefering, (born 1940), politician (SPD)
Mike de Vries, (born 1958), brand and business manager
Andrea Fischer (born 1960), politician (Alliance 90/The Greens) and journalist, former Federal Minister of Health
Meinolf Finke, (born 1963), poet
Helena Fromm (born 1987), taekwondo athlete, Olympic medalist
Georg Poplutz, tenor

People related to Arnsberg

Paul Moder (1896–1942), politician (NSDAP), Freikorps member and SS officer
Walther Neye (1901–1989), jurist and rector of the Humboldt University in Berlin
Fritz Cremer (1906–1993), sculptor (Buchenwald Memorial)
Lothar Collatz (1910–1990), mathematician
Günter Keute (born 1955), footballer
Friedrich Merz (born 1955), attorney and politician, member of the CDU
Meinolf Finke (born 1963), poet
Stephan Kampwirth (born 1967), theatre actor, film actor and voice actor
Rouven Schröder (born 1975), footballer
Philipp Hofmann (born 1993), footballer

Gallery

See also
 Herdringen Castle

References

External links

 Official website 
 Kunstverein Arnsberg
Neheim Notgeld (emergency currency)

 
Towns in North Rhine-Westphalia
Hochsauerlandkreis
Members of the Hanseatic League